2018 Special Photo Edition is the second special extended play from South Korean boy band UP10TION. It was released on August 20, 2018, by TOP Media. The album consists of four tracks, including the title track, "So Beautiful".

Commercial performance
The EP sold 23,320+ copies in South Korea. It peaked at number 3 on the Korean Gaon Chart.

Track listing

References 

2018 EPs
Korean-language EPs
Kakao M EPs
Up10tion EPs